Troblje is a settlement in the City Municipality of Slovenj Gradec in northern Slovenia. The area is part of the traditional region of Styria. The entire municipality is now included in the Carinthia Statistical Region.

The church in the settlement is dedicated to the Assumption of Mary and belongs to the Parish of Pameče. It was built in 1762.

References

External links
Troblje at Geopedia

Populated places in the City Municipality of Slovenj Gradec
Slovenj Gradec